TDK Mediactive was the brand name used by Japanese company TDK as a media subsidiary in Europe, and as a video game publishing subsidiary in North America.

TDK Mediactive Europe

TDK Mediactive Europe was a division of TDK Recording Media Europe founded in 1999 that published video games, software and DVDs under the TDK brand.

Following the US division of TDK's purchase of Sound Source Interactive and rebranding under the TDK Mediactive name, TDK Mediactive Europe became the exclusive European Publishing partner for technology and content licenses held by TDK Mediactive, Inc., which included publication and localisation However, TDK Mediactive Europe continued to publish and distribute their own titles, such as Knights of the Temple: Infernal Crusade.

On September 6, 2001, TDK Mediactive Europe supplied an exclusive North American licensing agreement to allow TDK Mediactive, Inc. to publish video games based on Mercedes-Benz.

On March 15, 2002, the company signed a deal with O3 Games to publish Templar.

On May 4, 2005, TDK Mediactive Europe signed a publishing deal with Playlogic Entertainment to allow the latter to publish their existing video game titles. The fate of the TDK Mediactive Europe company itself is currently unknown, although the company's website still remains open.

Video Games

Take-Two Licensing

TDK Mediactive, Inc. (formerly Sound Source Interactive, Inc., later renamed Take-Two Licensing, Inc.) was an American video game publisher based in Westlake Village, California. Founded as Sound Source Interactive by Vincent Bitetti in March 1990, the company acquired BWT Labs in March 1998. In September 2000, the company was acquired by TDK and became TDK Mediactive. Take-Two Interactive acquired the company's North American operations in September 2003, renaming itself as Take-Two Licensing the following December. With the foundation of Take-Two Interactive's 2K Games label in January 2005, Take-Two Licensing was effectively folded into the new subsidiary.

History 
Sound Source Interactive was founded in 1988 by Vincent Bitetti. In March 1998, Sound Source Interactive announced that they had acquired BWT Labs, a Berkeley, California-based video game developer.

The buyout resulted in Sound Source rebranding under the TDK Mediactive name, with the company's founder, Vincent Bitetti, remaining chief executive officer and Shin Tanabe, President of TDK Recording Media Europe and the European division of TDK Mediactive, becoming the publisher's chief operating officer. As TDK Mediactive, the company published various video games, of which many based on licensed properties.

On April 13, 2001, the company signed a five-year deal with clothing brand No Limits to publish games based on the license.

On May 21, 2002, the company signed a deal with Hasbro to produce video games based on the Tonka property for Nintendo systems under a sub-licensing deal with Infogrames, who were Hasbro's master video game licensor at the time. On October 18, 2002, the company launched TDK Impulse, a publishing label intended for games that had "broad consumer appeal and a low price point".

On September 3, 2003, TDK Mediactive, Inc. announced that they were to be acquired by Take-Two Interactive for an estimated . As a result of the acquisition, TDK Mediactive, Inc. was renamed Take-Two Licensing, Inc. and Take-Two Interactive received all licenses formerly held by TDK Mediactive, except for those based on Shrek.

On January 25, 2005, Take-Two Interactive announced the opening of publishing label 2K Games, into which Take-Two Licensing was folded.

Games published

As TDK Mediactive

As Take-Two Licensing

References 

Take-Two Interactive divisions and subsidiaries
Video game publishers
Video game companies established in 1990
Video game companies disestablished in 2005
Defunct video game companies of the United States
Defunct companies based in Greater Los Angeles